Isidora Dolores Ibárruri Gómez (9 December 189512 November 1989), also known as  (English: "the Passionflower"), was a Spanish Republican politician of the Spanish Civil War of 1936–1939 and a communist known for her slogan ¡No Pasarán! ("They shall not pass!") issued during the Battle for Madrid in November 1936.

She joined the Spanish Communist Party when it was founded in 1920. In the 1930s she became a writer for the Communist Party of Spain (PCE) publication Mundo Obrero and in February 1936 was elected to the Cortes Generales as a PCE deputy for Asturias. Going into exile from Spain towards the end of the Civil War in 1939, she became General Secretary of the Central Committee of the Communist Party of Spain, a position she held from 1942 to 1960. The Party then named her honorary president of the PCE, a post she held for the rest of her life. Upon her return to Spain in 1977 she was re-elected as a deputy to the Cortes for the same region she had represented from 1936 to 1939 under the Spanish Second Republic.

Biography
Dolores Ibárruri was born in 1895 the eighth of nine children. She had a Basque miner father and a Castilian mother. She grew up in Gallarta, but later moved to Somorrostro (Biscay). Gallarta was next to a large siderite mine.

Ibárruri left school at 15 after spending two years preparing for teachers' college at the encouragement of the schoolmistress. Her parents could not afford further education, so she went to work as a seamstress and later as a housemaid. She became a waitress in the town of Arboleda, the most important urban nucleus in the region of Somorrostro. There she met Julián Ruiz Gabiña, union activist and founder of Socialist Youth of Somorrostro. They married in late 1915, two years after the birth of their first child. The young couple participated in the general strike of 1917 and Ruiz returned to jail. During this time, Ibárruri spent nights reading the works of Karl Marx and others found in the library of the Socialist Workers' Centre in Somorrostro.

Ibárruri wrote her first article in 1918 for the miners' newspaper, El Minero Vizcaíno. The article came out during Holy Week and focused on religious hypocrisy, at odds with the Passion of Christ. Because of the article's theme and its timing, she signed it with the alias Pasionaria.

In 1920 Ibárruri and the Workers' Centre joined the budding Communist Party of Spain (PCE) and she was named a member of the Provincial Committee of the Basque Communist Party. After ten years of grassroots militancy, she was appointed to the Central Committee of the PCE in 1930.

During this time, Ibárruri had six children. Of her five girls, four died very young. She "used to relate how her husband made a small coffin out of a crate of fruit." Her son, Rubén, died at twenty-two in the Battle of Stalingrad. The remaining child, Amaya, outlived her mother. In 2008 Amaya resided in the working-class neighbourhood of Ciudad Lineal in Madrid. She died in 2018 aged 95.

In Madrid (1931–1936)
With the advent of the Second Republic in 1931, Ibárruri moved to Madrid. She became the editor of the PCE newspaper Mundo Obrero. She was arrested for the first time in September 1931. Jailed with common offenders, she persuaded them to begin a hunger strike to obtain freedom for political detainees. Following a second arrest in March 1932, she led other inmates in singing "The Internationale" in the visiting room. She encouraged them to turn down poorly paid menial labour in the prison yard. She wrote two articles from jail, one published by PCE periodical Frente Rojo and the other by Mundo Obrero. On March 17, 1932, she was elected to the Central Committee of the PCE at the 4th Congress held in Seville.

In 1933, she founded , a women's organization opposed to Fascism and war. On April 18, Soviet astronomer Grigory Neujmin discovered asteroid 1933 HA and named it "Dolores" after her. In November she travelled to Moscow as a delegate of the 13th Plenum of the Executive Committee of the Communist International (ECCI), which weighed the danger posed by Fascism and the threat of war. The sight of the Russian capital thrilled Ibárruri. "To me, who saw it through the eyes of the soul", she wrote in her autobiography, "it was the most wonderful city on earth. The construction of socialism was being managed from it. In it were taking shape the earthly dreams of freedom of generations of slaves, outcasts, serfs, proletarians. From it one could take in and perceive the march of humanity toward communism." She did not return to Spain until the new year.

In 1934 she attended the First Worldwide Meeting of Women against War and Fascism in Paris. Although the meeting was chaired by Gabrielle Duchêne, president of the French branch of the Women's International League for Peace and Freedom, the separate Rassemblement was an organ of the short-lived French Popular Front; both Rassemblement and the Front dissolved in 1939.

Toward the end of 1934, Ibárruri and two others spearheaded a risky rescue mission to the mining region of Asturias to bring more than a hundred starving children to Madrid. The parents of these children had been jailed following the failed October Revolution suppressed by General Franco at the behest of the Republican government. She succeeded, but she was detained briefly in the prisons of Sama de Langre and Oviedo. To spare her children further anguish, she sent them to the Soviet Union in the spring of 1935.

In 1935 she secretly crossed the Spanish border and went to the 7th World Congress of the Communist International held July 25–August 21 in Moscow. At this Congress, Georgi Dimitrov delivered a keynote speech in which he proposed an alliance with "progressive bourgeois" governments against the fascists. Under this doctrine, the Popular Front came to power in France in June 1936, suppressed the revolutionary fervour of the Communist masses and withheld aid from the Spanish Republic during the Spanish Civil War. The Non-Intervention Pact, which sealed the fate of the Republic, was introduced by Léon Blum, president of the French Popular Front, and signed on August 2, 1936, by France, Britain, Russia, Germany and Italy. Ibárruri welcomed Dimitrov's speech as vindication of the PCE's long-standing position and returned home "full of enthusiasm, determined to do the impossible to achieve a consensus among the various workers' and democratic organizations of our country.". At the same venue she was elected deputy member of the ECCI and became the second Communist figure in Spain after José Díaz, the secretary-general of the PCE.

In 1936 she was jailed for the fourth time after enduring gross abuse from the arresting officers in Madrid. Upon her release, she hurried to Asturias to campaign for the PCE in the general elections of February 16. In these elections, 323,310 ballots were cast. However, "one ballot, one vote" did not rule. Each voter could choose up to 13 candidates simultaneously. The PCE received 170,497 votes, enough to seat one member of Parliament, Dolores Ibárruri. The Popular Front's election platform included the release of political prisoners and La Pasionaria set out to free the detainees of Oviedo at once.

As soon as the victory of the Popular Front in the elections became known I, already an elect member of Parliament, showed up at the prison of Oviedo the next morning, went to the office of the Director, who had fled in a mad panic because he had behaved like a genuine criminal toward the Asturian prisoners interned after the revolution of October 1934, and there I found the Administrator to whom I said, "Give me the keys because the prisoners must be released this very day." He replied, "I have not received any orders", and I answered, "I am a member of the Republic's Parliament, and I demand that you hand over the keys immediately to set the prisoners free." He handed them over and I assure you that it was the most thrilling day of my activist life, opening the cells and shouting, "Comrades, everyone get out!" Truly thrilling. I did not wait for Parliament to sit or for the release order to be given. I reasoned, "We have run on the promise of freedom for the prisoners of the revolution of 1934—we won—today the prisoners go free."Dolores Ibárruri. , minutes 00:00 to 01:23.

In the months before the Spanish Civil War, she joined the strikers of Cadavio mine in Asturias and stood beside poor tenants evicted in a suburb of Madrid. Around this time, Federico García Lorca, La Pasionaria and friends were chatting and sharing a coffee in a Madrid cafeteria when Lorca, who had been studying Ibárruri's appearance, told her, "Dolores, you are a woman of grief, of sorrows...I'm going to write you a poem." The poet returned to Granada and met his death at the hands of the Nationalists before completing the task.

Civil War (1936–1939)
Ibárruri offered a string of speeches, some of them radio broadcasts from Madrid: "Danger! To arms!" (July 19), "Our fighters must lack for nothing!" (July 24), "Discipline, composure, vigilance!" (July 29), "Restrain the hand of the foreign meddlers!" (July 30), "Fascism shall not pass!" (August 24), "Better to die standing up than to live kneeling down!" (September 3), "A salute to our militiawomen on the front line" (September 4), "Our battle cry has been heard by the whole world" (September 15). It can be inferred that the majority in Madrid rallied to the side of the Republic, that uncontrolled elements roamed the capital that many rounds of gunfire were wasted out of nerves (July 29), that Nationalist propaganda was more effective (July 30) and that she understood early on that the war would be lost without foreign aid (August 24). On October 2 she wrote a revealing letter to her son in Russia, apologizing for not having written earlier and described the harrowing situation, "You cannot even imagine, my son, how savage is the struggle going on in Spain now...Fighting is going on daily and round the clock. And in this fighting some of our finest and bravest comrades have perished." She recounted that she had spent many days beside the troops at the front, and reveals her misgivings about the outcome of the war, "It is my hope that in spite of all the difficulties, particularly the lack of weapons, we shall still win."
The war became particularly brutal in 1937. Just as the Blitz later drove the Allies to bomb German cities mercilessly, so the Nationalist bombardment of open cities spurred Ibárruri (speaking as the fourth, newly named vice president of Congress) to demand an equal response from the "progressive bourgeois" government. President Manuel Azaña was an intellectual and a writer unwilling to flout constitutional or international laws. Prime Minister Francisco Largo Caballero was a socialist who was reluctant to cooperate with the PCE. The closing lines of that speech signalled her readiness to endorse radical violence,

On February 24, Stalin forbade Soviet volunteers to be sent to fight in Spain, but he did not recall Order of Lenin awardee Alexander Orlov of the NKVD (secret police). Orlov and the NKVD orchestrated May Days, the war that broke out between May 3–8 in Barcelona between the Popular Front and the Trotskyist Workers Party of Marxist Unification (POUM). The battle left some 1,000 fighters dead and 1,500 injured, though estimates vary. With the annihilation of the POUM, Stalin deprived the fugitive Leon Trotsky of a possible Spanish haven. Orlov used the same methods of terror, duplicity and deception that were employed in the Great Purge (1936–38).

As a result of the May 3–8 events in Barcelona, the Trotskyists and the Anarchists became, in Ibárruri's mind, the "Fascist enemy within."

When we point out the need of opposing Trotskyism we discover a very strange phenomenon, that voices are raised in its defense in the ranks of certain organizations and among certain circles in certain parties. These voices belong to people who themselves are intoxicated with this counter-revolutionary ideology. The Trotskyists have long been transformed into the agents of Fascism, into the agents of the German Gestapo. We saw this on the ground during the May putsch in Catalonia; we saw this clearly in the disturbances that occurred in various other places. And everybody will realize this when the trial opens against the P.O.U.M. leaders who were caught spying. And we realize that the hand of Fascism is behind every attempt to demoralize our home front, to undermine the authority of the Republic. Therefore it is essential that we wipe out Trotskyism with a firm hand, for Trotskyism is no longer a political option for the working class but an instrument of the counter-revolution.

Trotskyism must be rooted out of the proletarian ranks of our Party as one roots out poisonous weeds. The Trotskyists must be rooted out and disposed of like wild beasts, for otherwise every time our men wish to go on the offensive we will not be able to do so due to lawlessness caused by the Trotskyists in the rear. An end must be put to these traitors once and for all so that our men on the front lines can fight without fear of being stabbed in the back.

Ibárruri ascribed the events to an "anarchotrotskyist" attempt at shutting down the Republican government on orders from Franco, acting in tandem with Adolf Hitler. She said the violence was the culmination of an anarchist plot that included plans to stop the movement of trains and cut all telegraph and telephone lines. She cited an "order [from the Catalan government] to its forces to control the telephone building and disarm all people whom they encounter in the streets without proper authorization" as the aim of the anarchist plan. However, she provided no evidence to support these claims, which were widely held by fellow Party members at the time but have since been discredited.

The Communist party alleged that the anarchist "putsch" was motivated by their resentment of the centralized military command sought by the Communists and their allies in Lluís Companys's Catalan government and their desire to seize political power. The anarchists and Trotskyists saw the events as an attempt by the Communist Party (in close contact with the Stalinist NKVD) to rule over all revolutionary activity and blamed the Communists for authoritarianism. They contrasted the Communists' police state to the egalitarian conditions that obtained prior to the May 1937 events.

Ibárruri, Díaz and the rest of the PCE set out to destroy the Trotskyites.

The remnants of the POUM leadership were put on trial in Barcelona on October 11, 1938. Referring to the arraignments, Ibárruri said: "If there is an adage which says that in normal times it is preferable to acquit a hundred guilty ones than to punish a single innocent one, when the life of a people is in danger it is better to convict a hundred innocent ones than to acquit a single guilty one"

On April 30, 1938, Stalin proposed a military alliance to France and Britain, in effect, forsaking the Spanish Republic.

Exile, part I (1939–1960)
On March 6, 1939, she flew out of Spain under enemy naval fire to the major Algerian port city of Oran then under French sovereignty. Her arrival came as a surprise to the authorities, who hurriedly put her aboard a liner bound for Marseille. The ship's captain was an Nationalist sympathizer, but a clandestine Communist cell aboard ship made sure that he did not steer the ship toward Nationalist-held Barcelona. This was the third time that Ibárruri had evaded capture by the Nationalists.

She was helped in France by the Communists, who sheltered her in Paris under police surveillance (the Communist Party would be outlawed by the government of Édouard Daladier on September 26). From Paris she travelled to Moscow and stayed there with Díaz, generals Enrique Líster and Juan Modesto and others. She was reunited with Amaya and Rubén, who had escaped from a French internment camp at the end of the Spanish Civil War.

The Soviet Union received the refugees warmly. Ibárruri was given an apartment in Díaz's building. She was assigned a chauffeur to drive her around Moscow and she was invited to dine at the Dimitrovs'. She liked to attend the Bolshoi Theatre and the Romen Theatre. She was an avid reader. She delighted in seeing the emancipation of Russian women. She helped other families adapt to their new country and overall she felt happy enough to sing on occasion.

Ibárruri worked in the Executive Committee of the Communist International Secretariat at the Communist International Headquarters near the Kremlin. The work involved the continual evaluation, analysis and discussion of the progress of Communism outside the Soviet Union. This task was complemented by internal discussions in the PCE central committee which focused on Spain. No serious disagreement existed between the Communist Party of Spain and the Communist Party of the Soviet Union until 1968 over the Warsaw Pact invasion of Czechoslovakia. The PCE supported/excused Stalin's domestic and foreign policies, including the signing of the Molotov–Ribbentrop Pact on August 24, 1939.

In January 1940, La Pasionaria wrote the following praise of Joseph Stalin.

Ibárruri was asked to manage a new short-wave radio station that broadcast news, analysis and opinion to the citizens of Francoist Spain. The Moscow station carried the official name of Radio España Independiente, but in Spain it was nicknamed "La Pirenaica" partly on the false belief that it was located in the Pyrenees and partly because the radio itself used the label occasionally. Radio España Independiente started to broadcast on July 22, 1941, one month after Germany invaded the Soviet Union. Initial broadcasts were made from candle-lit basements under sporadic aerial bombardment. Ibárruri related that seniors, women and children kept watch on the terraces of Moscow every night for the burning sticks of incendiaries scattered by the Luftwaffe. Civilians would pick up the blazing sticks with a pair of tongs and dunk them in pails of water.

Many Spanish refugees volunteered to fight alongside the Russians despite Stalin's initial disapproval. According to Ibárruri, more than 200 died in battle. On July 18, 1941, she greeted the Spanish 4th Special Unit assigned to the defence of the Kremlin. Elsewhere, from Crimea to Finland, the Spanish Communist volunteers fought as guerrillas deployed behind enemy lines, in the Red Army or with the Soviet air force; some made it to Berlin and at least one scouted territory held by the Spanish Nationalist Blue Division.

On October 13, 1941, martial law was declared in Moscow as the German 3rd Panzer Army came within  of the capital. On October 16 the ECCI was evacuated by train from Moscow to Ufa the capital of Republic of Bashkortostan. Díaz was gravely ill and went south to Tbilisi the capital of the Georgian Soviet socialist Republic.

Radio España Independiente now broadcast from Ufa. She used various aliases such as Antonio de Guevara or Juan de Guernica presumably to make believe the station had an extensive network of commentators and newspapermen.

On March 19, 1942, Díaz committed suicide. La Pasionaria became secretary-general of the PCE after a brief period of consultations by Stalin.

On September 3 Ibárruri's son Rubén Ruiz Ibárruri lost his life fighting heroically at Stalingrad. Asteroid 2423 Ibarruri is named after him.

On March 1, 1943, Stalin created the Union of Polish Patriots and on May 15 the ECCI annulled the Third International and granted theoretical independence to every national Communist party. Ibárruri agreed with the decision.

On February 23, 1945, La Pasionaria left Moscow on a trip to Tehran, Baghdad and Cairo. In Cairo she and her party booked passage on the first passenger ship to leave Alexandria, understanding it was going to Marseille. In fact the ship, part of a British convoy, headed to Boulogne-sur-Mer near the Belgian border; the voyage lasted three months and she arrived in Paris too late to meet with Juan Negrín, the last president of the Spanish Republic to work out a common political strategy against Franco.

On December 5–8 the PCE held a plenum of the central committee in Toulouse where Santiago Carrillo, the former leader of Unified Socialist Youth in pre-war Spain, who had arrived in liberated France in November 1944, "gained control of the PCE", according to fellow Communist Enrique Líster.

In his book Así destruyó Carrillo el PCE Líster criticized Ibárruri's conduct between 1939 and 1945, writing:

The persecution of dissidents inside the PCE increased with time,

Interrogations were cruel, "Carrillo and Anton inflicted true terror. Some comrades came to the brink of insanity during the rounds of interrogation and others were driven to suicide out of the despicable accusations made against them."

The book names party members betrayed or murdered: Juanchu de Portugalete (1944), Gabriel León Trilla (1945; "the decision to eliminate Trilla belongs to Santiago Carrillo and Dolores Ibárruri"), Jesus Hernandez (1946), Lino (1950), Joan Comorera (1954), Monzon, Quiñones, Luis Montero, Jose el Valenciano. Even generals Modesto and Líster himself were at one point in the crosshairs of the PCE leadership, only to be saved inadvertently by Stalin who praised them before Ibárruri, Carrillo and Anton.

The PCE persecuted Communists in northwestern Spain during those years. In 2008 Victor Garcia found the body of his father partially buried in a wooded area of O Deza (Pontevedra). He had been shot in the head. Garcia's father had not fled Spain after the defeat of 1939; he stayed behind and helped to organize a guerrilla force of 947 fighters in Galicia. Around the year 1944 the central committee of the PCE, then living in France and headed by Ibárruri and Carrillo ordered his execution. After it was carried out in 1948, the regional PCE liaison wrote, "At last we have hunted him down. This riffraff withstood us like a leech. We managed to catch him in Lalin from where he directed certain adventurous, uncontrolled groups. He is a provocateur who has given us many troubles; though belatedly we have eliminated him."

The exile, part II (1960–1977)
At the 6th Congress of the PCE held in Prague between January 28–31, 1960, 65-year-old Ibárruri ceded the post of secretary-general to Carrillo and accepted the honorary position of president. As confirmation of her retirement from active politics she wrote her first memoir in 1960. The book, entitled El Unico Camino (The Only Way) was published first in Paris in 1962. The following year it was printed in Moscow. The book was translated into English and published in New York in 1966 under a new title. In her second memoir, Memorias de Pasionaria, 1939–1977, Ibárruri observates that the childhood reminiscences recorded in El Unico Camino came to her in sharp detail.

On November 10, 1961, she received a Doctor Honoris Causa in Historical Sciences by Moscow State University for her contributions to the development of Marxist theory. In her acceptance speech she asserted that class struggle is the motor of history. In 1962 she attended the 10th Congress of the Italian Communist Party held December 2–8 in Rome where she met Socialists, Christian-Democrats and some church representatives. To the clerics she remarked, "We are not as wicked as you think, and we are not as good as we probably think we are." During the first few months of 1963 Ibárruri unsuccessfully appealed for the Spanish government to spare the life of executive committee member Julián Grimau. Before his execution Grimau wrote to Ibárruri saying, "My execution will be the last one." On the week of May 13 Ibárruri unveiled a plaque in his honour on Building 11, Block 1, of newly renamed Grimau Street in Moscow. On December 5 she arrived in Havana to commemorate the 5th anniversary of the Cuban Revolution.  Cuban leader Fidel Castro invited Ibárruri to move permanently to the island, but she declined.

On April 15, 1964, she spoke at the banquet celebrating Nikita Khrushchev's 70th birthday. On April 30 she shared the International Lenin Prize for Strengthening Peace Among Peoples, with three others. On February 22, 1965, Ibárruri asked the ministers of External Affairs and the Spanish army and the defense attorney, asking to appear as a witness at the court martial of former Republican commander Justo Lopez de la Fuente. De la Fuente had been condemned to twenty-three years in prison. Everyone expected that he would be sentenced to death. She held a press conference in Moscow to publicize these actions. On February 27 the Captain General of the Madrid region annulled the proceedings. However, the first sentence stuck and Lopez later died in prison.

Sometime during 1965 Ibárruri flew from Paris to Dubrovnik to apologize as president of the PCE to Josip Broz Tito. On May 17, 1948, the Cominform, successor to the ECCI, had expelled Yugoslavia from the community of Socialist countries and Ibárruri had lent her voice and pen to his censure. The 20th Congress of the Communist Party of the Soviet Union held February 14–26, 1956, repudiated the charges against Yugoslavia. Now Ibárruri came face to face with the man she had slandered. She started to apologize profusely, but Tito cut her short and said, "Do not vex yourself, Dolores, do not worry. I know very well how things worked in those days. I know it perfectly. Furthermore, believe me, I most likely would have done what you did had I been in your situation." Ibárruri returned to visit Yugoslavia several times thereafter. In late December 1965 the Presidium of the Supreme Soviet of the USSR decorated Ibárruri with an Order of Lenin medal. A total of 431,418 decorations were given out between 1930 and 1991, but only seventeen went to foreigners.

Ibárruri was chair of the editorial commission that wrote the four volumes of Guerra y revolución en España, 1936–1939 (War and Revolution in Spain, 1936–1936) which present the PCE's view of the Spanish Civil War. The tomes were published between 1966 and 1971.

On April 19, 1969, former Republican general Juan Modesto died in Prague. Ibárruri pronounced a brief eulogy. On May 6, 1970, the Spanish right-wing newspaper ABC reported that the PCE and the Kremlin had reached a new pact whereby the Spanish party dropped its censure of the Soviet invasion of Czechoslovakia in exchange for the Kremlin's blessing on the party's wish to collaborate with non-Communist parties. The newspaper also reported that PCE president Dolores Ibárruri's permanent residence was Moscow and the secretary-general's Italy.

On November 8, 1972, Ibárruri's estranged husband, 82-year-old Julin Ruiz Gabiña, returned from a workers' clinic in Moscow to Somorrostro, expressing a desire "to rest and to die in my land." On March 14, 1974, Ibárruri condemned the execution on March 2 of 26-year-old Catalan anarchist Salvador Puig Antich. She noted the revolutionary political stance taken by Bishop Antonio Añoveros Ataún of Bilbao who defended Basque cultural identity publicly and who defied Franco's decision to remove him. On November 20, 1975, Spanish dictator Franco died. Ibárruri commented on the news laconically, "May the earth rest light upon him." On the week of November 17 Ibárruri was invested with the Order of the October Revolution. On December 14 many representatives of Communist parties from around the world gathered in Rome to pay homage to her. The next summer Ibárruri attended the 3rd Plenum of the Central Committee of the PCE held July 28–31, 1976, in Rome under the clarion call of "national reconciliation."

On the night of January 24, 1977, a commando unit of Spanish and Italian neo-Fascists shot dead three Communist labour-rights attorneys, a law student and a manager at their law office in downtown Madrid; four others were seriously injured. On February 16 Ibárruri asked Spanish authorities in Moscow to allow her to return to Spain. She stated that she had travelled outside the USSR many times, that her profession was a publicist and contributor to newspapers and magazines, that she was the president of the PCE and that she wanted to travel freely to her own country. On February 22 the still-illegal PCE made public its list of candidates for the general elections of June 15. Ibárruri appeared as a candidate in two electoral districts to be assured of election, one Madrid and the other Asturias; Carrillo appeared in three. Despite a climate of fear and insecurity the Spanish government legalized the PCE on April 9, but the authorities denied Ibárruri a visa. On April 27 Julian Ruiz said that he would not be at the airport to greet his estranged wife, "Nevertheless she is the mother of my children and I wish her health and a peaceful life.", The PCE arranged to have Ibárruri land in Madrid with or without a visa on May 13. However, on May 12 the authorities relented and provided it.

Back in Madrid (1977–1989)
At 2:00 pm Moscow time on May 13, 1977, Ibárruri left Sheremetyevo Airport aboard an Aeroflot jet after a "very affectionate" sendoff by Boris Ponomarev and Mikhail Suslov, three other civilians and by Colonel Sergeyev the husband of Ibárruri's daughter; on the tarmac a girl dressed in traditional costume offered the departing president of the PCE a bouquet of flowers. At 7:59 pm Madrid time the Aeroflot jetliner landed at Barajas Airport. The PCE lied about her arrival and did not give her an official welcome (secretary-general Carrillo was in Seville). Five hundred party members and sympathizers showed up at the airport, some waving PCE flags and wearing red berets with a communist insignia; they went up on the observation deck and watched and cheered as she landed. She went to the office of the Registrar General of Fuencarral and changed her name from Isidora to Dolores.

Ibárruri's first campaign rally was held May 23 on the Exhibition fairgrounds of Bilbao before 30–50,000 supporters. She acknowledged feeling tired, but volunteered to explain the workings of socialist countries "where the workers can live very well without capitalism"; however the emotion of the day exhausted her and an evening press conference had to be cancelled. The next day she spoke in the Suarez Puerta Stadium of Avilés in front of "many thousands of workers." A 20-year-old eyewitness remembers, "The city wore red. 'The Internationale' was heard everywhere... the atmosphere, the silence when Pasionaria spoke, the explosion of joy that day, they are unforgettable memories." On May 25 at the presentation of his book, Eurocommunism and the State, Carrillo told a reporter that Ibárruri reminded him of the Pablo Iglesias he knew as a child, "a sick elderly man who participated very little in the activities of the party and who often kept quiet during meetings." On May 28 Ibárruri spoke in Sama de Langreo and right-wing newspaper ABC admitted that she was drawing "multitudes." On May 30 she affirmed in La Felguera that the same spirit which had moved her in 1936 lived on to fight for the PCE and for Asturias. On June 8 a full house (6,000 people according to ABC, 8,000 according to La Vanguardia) listened to her in the arena Palacio de los Deportes of the Asturian capital Oviedo. The following day she appeared at the national rally of the party held in the neighbouring province of León.

The general elections of June 15 in the Oviedo constituency resulted in 584,061 votes cast, for a voter turnout rate of 74.6%. PCE got 60,297 votes (10.5% of the ballot), good enough to seat one member, Dolores Ibárruri. The party with the most votes was the Spanish Workers' Socialist Party (31.8%). In contrast, the dictatorship's party, Falange Española, garnered a minuscule 0.46%. On July 13 at 10:05 am—she notes in her memoirs—Ibárruri stepped inside the chamber of Congress she had vacated forty-one years before. Moments later she occupied the inaugural session's vice-presidential chair. The next day Radio España Independiente aired its last broadcast, number 108,300. On July 22 the king opened Parliament. She joined in the 1-minute general standing ovation, although she remained seated. Earlier, as Ibárruri entered Congress, a 56-year-old man in Falangist uniform gave the Roman salute and heckled her, "Drop dead! If you had any shame you would not have returned to Spain."

On August 4, 87-year-old Ruiz died in a hospital residence of Barakaldo; Ibárruri attended his funeral. She travelled to Moscow in October to celebrate the 60th anniversary of the Russian Revolution and did not return until November 21.

Her ailing health put her in hospital three times during the first nine months after her return. Her age and frail health prompted the regional branch of the PCE in Asturias to ask for her retirement and substitution as early as November 21, 1977. However, the central committee argued that her symbolic presence was important, and she served out her full term. On October 31, 1978, she voted with a very loud "Yes" for the new Spanish Constitution. On December 29, President Adolfo Suárez dissolved Congress and called new elections for March 1, 1979. The 84-year-old Ibárruri was not a candidate.

Her life and that of every Communist was put in danger on February 23, 1981, when Fascist elements of the Spanish armed forces and of the paramilitary police staged a coup.

Broadly speaking, though, the remaining years of Ibárruri's life were a tranquil sequence of feminist rallies, political rallies, congresses of the PSUC and PCE, of presiding over the meetings of the executive committee, and of summer holidays in the Soviet Union. Ibárruri denounced Enver Hoxha's stance against Khrushchev during the Sino-Soviet Split, saying Hoxha was behaving "like a dog that bites the hand that feeds him". Survivors of the International Brigades came to celebrate her 90th birthday. The PCE threw a party in the arena Palacio de Deportes of Madrid for 15,000 to 20,000 well-wishers.

In October 1987 Ibárruri solicited financial assistance from Congress. She had not contributed to the national social security program and therefore had no pension. Congress granted her a monthly perquisite of 150,000 Pesetas (approximately $1,250 in US dollars at the time). On September 13, 1989, she was hospitalized, gravely ill with pneumonia. She recovered and left the hospital on October 15, but she experienced a relapse on November 7 and died on November 12 at age 93. On November 14, thousands of people paid homage as her body lay on a catafalque. Veterans of the civil war, war amps, the ambassadors of Cuba, Czechoslovakia, East Germany, Yugoslavia and China were among the first to pay their respects as was the mayor of Madrid. On November 16, a short cortege carried her body from PCE headquarters to the Plaza of Columbus where Rafael Alberti and secretary-general Julio Anguita delivered a brief eulogy. Afterward, she was driven to Almudena Cemetery and interred near the grave of Pablo Iglesias. Thousands attended her funeral and chanted, "They shall not pass!" The mayors of some townships declared four days of official mourning.

Monuments and memorials

Dolores Ibarruri served as inspiration to artist Arthur Dooley who was commissioned in 1974 by the International Brigade Association of Scotland to create a monument commemorating the 2,100 British volunteers of the International Brigade, ordinary men and women who joined the republican forces in the Spanish Civil War in their fight against Franco's regime. The monument's inscription is dedicated to the 534 volunteers who died in the conflict, 65 of them from Glasgow, which is where the monument is situated.

The statue was funded by money raised by Trade Unionists and Labour movement supporters. However, the £3000 raised was insufficient to cover the artist's plans for the statue to be cast in bronze. Instead, an armature was welded together from scrap iron and covered in fibreglass. The final version of the monument is a stylised female figure, representing Dolores Ibarruri, in a long dress, standing with legs apart and arms raised. On the plinth, Dooley carved Dolores' famous slogan – 'better to die on your feet than live forever on your knees'. The phrase was first used by the Mexican revolutionary leader, Emiliano Zapata, but Ibarruri gave it new meaning when she used it during the miners strike in Asturias, Spain, in 1934.

Over time, the B listed statue fell into extremely poor condition and this generated criticism from the public, elected officials and trades unionists. A restoration project was carried out between April and August 2010 and the monument was re-dedicated on 23 August 2010 by Leader of the council, Bailie Gordon Matheson, and General Secretary of the Scottish Trades Union Congress, Grahame Smith, in the presence of Thomas Watters, 97, a surviving International Brigade veteran. Watters was a veteran of the Scottish Ambulance Unit, which worked at the front line on the battlefields of Spain to aid wounded fighters and volunteers from across the world.

In February 2017 the People's Party of the Basque Country called for a street named after her to be renamed because of her “terrible role in the Spanish Civil War” and her close association to Stalin.

In popular culture 
Brazilian punk rock band Blind Pigs included an English language song about Ibárruri in their 2002 album "Blind Pigs".

In Anthony Powell's novel Casanova's Chinese Restaurant, Norah and Eleanor have a picture of La Pasionaria on their mantelpiece.

In Ernest Hemingway's novel For Whom the Bell Tolls, El Sordo's unit debate La Pasionaria's motive for sending her son to the Soviet Union away from the Spanish Civil War while under attack from pro-Franco forces.

Glasgow-based fusion band Inyal included an instrumental song dedicated to Ibárruri, entitled "Pasionaria" on their 2017 album "INYAL".

The American sculptor Jo Davidson created a portrait bust of Ibárruri in 1938. Davidson describes his sittings with Ibárruri at his hotel in Madrid in his autobiography Between Sittings: An Informal Autobiography.

In 2012, Nadezhda Tolokonnikova, a member of the Russian protest punk band Pussy Riot wore a T-shirt with the phrase "¡No Pasaran!" with an image of a raised clenched fist during her trial.

See also
 Jorge Semprún

Notes

List of works
 Dolores Ibárruri: Speeches & Articles 1936–1938, New York, 1938.
 El único camino, Moscow, 1963.
 Memorias de Dolores Ibarruri, Pasionaria: la lucha y la vida, Barcelona, 1985.
 They Shall Not Pass: The Autobiography of La Pasionaria, New York, 1966.
 Memorias de Pasionaria, 1939–1977: Me faltaba Espana, Barcelona, 1984.

External links

 Dolores Ibárruri Archive at marxists.org
 Spartacus International article on Dolores Ibárruri
 ¡No Pasarán! Speech Dolores Ibárruri's "No Pasaran!" speech translated to English

1895 births
1989 deaths
People from Abanto y Ciérbana-Abanto Zierbena
Communist Party of Spain politicians
Members of the Congress of Deputies of the Second Spanish Republic
Members of the constituent Congress of Deputies (Spain)
Politicians from the Basque Country (autonomous community)
Spanish anti-fascists
Spanish people of the Spanish Civil War (Republican faction)
Exiles of the Spanish Civil War in France
Marxist journalists
Marxist writers
Spanish women in politics
Female revolutionaries
Women in war 1900–1945
Women in war in Spain
Recipients of the Order of Lenin
Lenin Peace Prize recipients
Burials at Cementerio de la Almudena
People granted political asylum in the Soviet Union
Exiles of the Spanish Civil War in the Soviet Union
Spanish women of the Spanish Civil War (Republican faction)
Spanish people of Basque descent
Exiled Spanish politicians
Women in the Spanish Civil War